The Spinning House, also known as the Cambridge House of Correction and Hobson's Bridewell, was a workhouse and prison built in Cambridge in the 1600s and demolished in 1901. In the Victorian era it held local women suspected by Proctors of having a corrupting influence on the male student population, until this power was removed by Act of Parliament in 1893. This removal followed the high-profile case of 17-year-old Daisy Hopkins, who was arrested in 1891 for the crime of "walking with a member of the university"; she sued the Proctor and lost in a trial that severely attacked her moral character but nevertheless prompted public debate about the legitimacy of such arrests.

The former site of the Spinning House is marked by a blue plaque.

References

Workhouses in Cambridgeshire
Women's prisons in England
Defunct prisons in England
Demolished buildings and structures in England
Buildings and structures demolished in 1901